Lt. Col. John Patrick Duggan (1918 – 8 March 2013) was an Irish soldier and later the registrar of the Dublin Institute for Advanced Studies.

Selected publications
 Neutral Ireland and the Third Reich. Gill and Macmillan, Dublin, 1985.
 A History of the Irish Army. Gill and Macmillan, Dublin,  1991.
 Herr Hempel at the German legation in Dublin 1937–1945. Irish Academic Press, Dublin, 2002.

References 

1918 births
2013 deaths
Irish Army officers
20th-century Irish historians
21st-century Irish historians
Bomb disposal personnel